The 2013 Northwest Missouri State Bearcats football team represented Northwest Missouri State University as a member of the Mid-America Intercollegiate Athletics Association (MIAA) during the 2013 NCAA Division II football season. Led by third-year head coach Adam Dorrel, the team finished the regular season with an undefeated 11–0 record. They won their fifth NCAA Division II Football Championship with a win over Lenoir–Rhyne in the NCAA Division II Championship Game by a score of 43–28. The Bearcats played their home games at Bearcat Stadium in Maryville, Missouri, which has been the Bearcats' home stadium since 1917.

Schedule

References

Northwest Missouri
Northwest Missouri State Bearcats football seasons
NCAA Division II Football Champions
Mid-America Intercollegiate Athletics Association football champion seasons
College football undefeated seasons
Northwest Missouri State Bearcats football